Maria Anastacia Keogh (born 17 October 1982) is an Irish former playwright, musician, educator and actress.

She wrote her first play A Change of Heart in 2008. The play was based on a modern-day story of Saint Francis of Assisi and she staged it in the Town Hall Theatre, Galway, to help raise funds for the Franciscan Abbey Church Roof Restoration Fund. After receiving a warm response from her first production she went to write and direct her next play, William Shakespeare's Contemporary Mix. The play was a story about the playwright William Shakespeare. He falls asleep and awakes in a dream. A humorous Pixie introduces Shakespeare to some of his best play characters from Hamlet to Macbeth.

She has composed music for many productions and the feature film, The Doubleganger. Keogh was a performer with the band Croi8 up until September 2018. The band also featured David O'Keeffe on acoustic guitar, Barry Hurley on percussion and vocals, and Sinead Bracken on flute and effects. They launched their first EP, "Flying Through the Ash", in August 2010 and held a charity concert in the Town Hall Theatre, Galway, for St Vincent de Paul. She was also an important contributor to Croí8's album One Step Closer, providing vocals and writing lyrics for some of their songs.

She was elected a governor for the National University Ireland, Galway, and was nominated as a member of the NUI Senate.

Filmography

References

External links
 The Musical Circus, Town Hall Theatre
 

1982 births
Living people
Irish dramatists and playwrights
Irish film actresses
21st-century Irish actresses
Irish women singers
Irish songwriters
Irish women composers